Vacuum Oil Company was an American oil company known for its Gargoyle 600-W steam cylinder motor oil. After being taken over by the original Standard Oil Company and then becoming independent again, in 1931 Vacuum Oil merged with the Standard Oil Company of New York to form Socony-Vacuum, later renamed to Mobil and eventually merging with Standard Oil of New Jersey (itself renamed to Exxon) to form ExxonMobil in 1999.

History 
Vacuum Oil was founded in 1866 by Matthew Ewing and Hiram Bond Everest, of Rochester, New York. Lubrication oil was an accidental discovery while attempting to distil kerosene. Everest noted the residue from the extraction was suitable as a lubricant. Soon after, the product became popular for use in steam engines and internal-combustion engines. Ewing sold his interest to Everest, who carried on the company. Vacuum was bought by Standard Oil in 1879.

It had used "Mobiloil" automobile lubricating oil brand since 1904, and by 1918 it became recognizable enough that the company filed it for registration as a trademark (it was registered in 1920). When Standard Oil was broken up in 1911 due to the Sherman Antitrust Act, Vacuum became an independent company again.

Vacuum Oil and Standard Oil of New York (Socony) merged in 1931, after the government gave up attempts to prevent it. The newly-combined entity, Socony-Vacuum Corp, was the world's third-largest oil company.

In 1933, Socony-Vacuum and Standard Oil Company of New Jersey (which had oil production and refineries in Indonesia) merged their interests in the Far East into a 50–50 joint venture. Standard Vacuum Oil Company, or "Stanvac," operated in 50 countries, including New Zealand, China, and the region of East Africa, before it was dissolved in 1962.

During World War II, the Tschechowitz I & II subcamps of Auschwitz in Czechowice-Dziedzice provided forced labor for Vacuum Oil Company facilities in Poland which were captured and operated by Nazi Germany.

In 1955, the company became Socony Mobil Oil Company. In 1966, it was renamed Mobil Oil Corporation, later shortened to Mobil Corporation.

Legal challenges 
In 1887, founder Hiram Bond Everest and son Charles M. Everest were charged with conspiracy to destroy competitor Buffalo Lubricating Oil Co. It was alleged that, having sold a three-quarter interest in their company to Standard Oil, they were attempting to destroy their rival's refinery, preventing it from manufacturing petroleum products, and from acquiring Vacuum's skilled employees. One employee who had left Vacuum to work for Buffalo was Albert A. Miller, who was bribed to sabotage the new company's plant, causing an explosion. Hiram and Charles Everest were both found guilty, but there was insufficient evidence to prove the allegation that the Everests had acted under instructions from Standard Oil.

In 1907, Vacuum Oil, Standard Oil, New York Central Railroad, and Pennsylvania Railroad were all indicted for violations in Inter-State Commerce laws.  Vacuum Oil was charged with shipping 228 cars of petroleum and petroleum products to Standard Oil at unlawful rates, via the New York Central and Pennsylvania railroads.

References

External links

 

Defunct oil companies of the United States
Energy companies established in 1866
Non-renewable resource companies established in 1866
Non-renewable resource companies disestablished in 1955
1866 establishments in New York (state)
1955 disestablishments in New York (state)
Defunct companies based in New York (state)
Former ExxonMobil subsidiaries